Ashtasahasram is a sub-sect of the Iyer community of Tamil Brahmins from the Indian state of Tamil Nadu.

Culture 
The Ashtasahasrams as Iyers belong to the Smarta (Shaivite) tradition, along with the Vadamas, Brahacharanams, Vadyamans/Madhyamans, and the Kanials/Kaniyalars. However, the Ashtasahasrams are considered inferior to the first two Brahmin groups.

The Ashtasahasrams follow the Taittirīya śākhā of the Kr̥ṣṇa Yajurveda.

They are Aparaśikhā Brahmins, who wear their traditional hair tuft towards the back of their head.

Divisions 

The Ashtasahasram community is further sub-divided into four groups:

 Āttiyūr
 Arivarpede
 Nandivādi
 Satkulam

References 

Tamil Brahmins
Social groups of Tamil Nadu